Balsora is an unincorporated community in Wise County, in the U.S. state of Texas.

History
Balsora was originally called Wild Horse Prairie, and under the latter name was founded in about 1890. A post office was established under the name Balsora in 1894, and was discontinued in 1924.

References

Unincorporated communities in Wise County, Texas
Unincorporated communities in Texas